Philip Banks III (born December 25, 1962) is the current Deputy Mayor of New York City for Public Safety and a retired law enforcement officer who served as NYPD chief of department in 2013 and 2014. As chief of department, Banks oversaw all patrol and specialty units. His brother, David C. Banks, has been appointed as New York City Schools Chancellor.

Education
Banks earned a Bachelor of Science degree in Business Administration from Lincoln University and graduated from the Police Management Institute at Columbia University in 2001. Banks is a member of Phi Beta Sigma fraternity, Mu chapter.

Career

New York Police Department 
Banks joined the New York City Police Department in July 1986 and began his career on patrol in the 81st Precinct. He was promoted to sergeant in March 1994, lieutenant in May 1997, captain in September 1999, deputy inspector in June 2001, inspector in December 2003, deputy chief in December 2006, and assistant chief in June 2009. He has served in the 70th, 73rd, 79th, 81st, 90th and Central Park precincts in addition to the Patrol Borough Brooklyn South, Harbor Unit, and School Safety Division Investigations Unit.

Banks most recently served as chief of the Community Affairs Bureau. Prior to commanding the Community Affairs Bureau, he was the commanding officer of Patrol Borough Manhattan North and has also commanded the 79th, 81st and Central Park precincts. He has also served as executive officer of Patrol Borough Brooklyn South and the 73rd Precinct.

He was named the first deputy commissioner, replacing Rafael Piñeiro upon his retirement.

Resignation 
After completing a 27-year career with NYPD, Banks resigned from his position as chief of department on October 31, 2014, citing a mix of personal and professional reasons. Speaking to reporters outside City Hall, Commissioner William Bratton said he would accept Banks's resignation "with great regret." It was later revealed that Banks resigned after he found out he was being investigated by the Federal Bureau of Investigation for having $300,000 of unexplained cash in his bank account. Banks is considered to be an unindicted co-conspirator in a corruption and bribery scandal in which Jona Rechnitz and Jeremy Reichberg are accused of trading cash and gifts to several NYPD officials, including Banks, in exchange for favors.

Ranks
Sworn in as a Patrolman – 1986  Promoted to Sergeant – 1992  Promoted to Lieutenant – 1995  Promoted to Captain – 1998  Promoted to Deputy Inspector – 2001  Promoted to Inspector – 2003  Promoted to Deputy Chief – 2006 Promoted to Assistant Chief – 2009  Promoted to Chief of Community Affairs – 2010  Chief of Department 2013

References

African-American police officers
African-American people in New York City politics
American police officers
Deputy mayors of New York City
New York City Police Department officers
Living people
1964 births
21st-century African-American people
20th-century African-American people